Hoplias is a genus of fish in the family Erythrinidae found in Central and South America.

Species

There are currently 13 recognized species in this genus:
 Hoplias aimara (Valenciennes, 1847)
 Hoplias australis Oyakawa & Mattox, 2009
 Hoplias brasiliensis (Spix & Agassiz, 1829)
 Hoplias curupira Oyakawa & Mattox, 2009
 Hoplias intermedius (Günther, 1864)
 Hoplias lacerdae A. Miranda-Ribeiro, 1908
 Hoplias malabaricus (Bloch, 1794) Wolf-fish, Traíra
 Hoplias mbigua Azpelicueta, Benítez, Aichino & Méndez, 2015 
 Hoplias microcephalus (Agassiz, 1829) 
 Hoplias microlepis (Günther, 1864) 
 Hoplias misionera Rosso, Mabragaña, González-Castro, Delpiani, Avigliano, Schenone & Díaz de Astarloa, 2016 
 Hoplias patana (Valenciennes, 1847)
 Hoplias teres (Valenciennes, 1847)

References

Erythrinidae
Fish of South America
Taxa named by Theodore Gill